Route 20 is a  provincial highway in Newfoundland and Labrador, extending from St. John's to the towns of Torbay, Flatrock, Shoe Cove, Pouch Cove, and the point of Cape St. Francis. Route 20 is located entirely on the Avalon Peninsula of Newfoundland.

Route description

The road begins in the east end of St. John's, where Kenna's Hill forks into two branches: Torbay Road (Route 20) and Logy Bay Road (Route 30).

Within the city of St. John's, Torbay Road is both a major arterial road and a significant commercial area, with many strip malls as well as the Torbay Road Mall and, north of the Trans-Canada Highway, the Stavanger Drive big-box retail area. The road is heavily travelled in the mornings and evenings as workers commute into and out of the city. At a point approximately 7 kilometres north of its southern terminus, Torbay Road continues northerly through the community of Torbay, while Route 20 transfers onto the Torbay Bypass. Completed in late 2011, the two-lane bypass diverts around Torbay, with access to the major intersecting roads of Indian Meal Line and Bauline Line; prior to its construction, the highway number continued through the centre of Torbay along Torbay Road. 

About 7 kilometres further north near Flatrock, Torbay Road and the Torbay Bypass reunite; both road names end at that point, while the highway number continues northerly for 9.6 kilometres under the name Pouch Cove Highway to the community of Pouch Cove, where it becomes Main Road and continues for 5.5 kilometres to the highway's northern terminus at the Cape St. Francis lighthouse in Biscayan Cove.

Major intersections

See also
List of Newfoundland and Labrador highways

References

20